The Lahore Chamber of Commerce & Industry (LCCI) was established in 1923. It was established to serve and represent the interests of the business community in Lahore, Pakistan.

History

The Lahore Chamber of Commerce and Industry was established by the businessmen and industrialists of Northern India in 1923 under the name of "Northern India Chamber of Commerce and Industry". In 1947 on creation of "The Islamic Republic of Pakistan", its name was changed to "West Pakistan Chamber of Commerce and Industry". In 1960, the present name, "The Lahore Chamber of Commerce and Industry", was adopted. Today, the chamber is the first ISO-Certified Chamber of Pakistan.

Aims and objectives

LCCI aims to represent its members and contribute to the nation's economic development through the promotion of trade and industry. LCCI acts as a bridge between the government and the business community. It plays an important role in policy formulation by maintaining a constant interaction with the relevant authorities.

Composition
LCCI is affiliated with the Federation of Pakistan Chamber of Commerce & Industry. It has two classes of membership, namely, Corporate and Associate. This Chamber has currently more than 32,000 members and LCCI claims to be the biggest chamber in Pakistan.

Management
The organization's policies and programs are determined by the 30 members of Executive Committee who are elected by the members, out of which one-third retire every year and in their place, new members are inducted through election. The office bearers are elected by the members of the Executive Committee every year. The President controls the working of the office and staff and directs all matters of the Chamber, with the assistance of Senior Vice-President and Vice-President.

Research and Development Department 
In 1985, Research and Development Department was established at LCCI to act as the Think Tank and Advocacy Arm. The department is active to help business community is meeting their day to day need through providing updated information regarding business and economy and macro and micro business and economic policies of the government. The department is in contact with various government and international agencies in order to get consultation regarding important national and international policy matters which could affect directly or indirectly business, trade and industry.

Past Presidents
 Ch. Nazer Muhammad (Late) 1967
 Mian Rafique Saigol (Late) 1968
 Mr. Naseer A.Sheikh (late) 1969
 Mr. Majeed Mufti (Late) 1970
 Ch. Muhammad Saeed (Late) 1971
 Mian Tajammal Hussain 1972
 Mr. Mumtaz A. Sheikh (Late) 1973
 Mr. M. Amin Agha 1974
 Mr. Abdullah Sheikh (Late) 1975
 Mr. A. Aziz Zulfiqar 1976
 Mr. M. Ijaz Butt 1977
 Mr. Maqbool Sadiq 1978
 Mr. Arshad Saeed 1979
 Sheikh Iqbal (Late) 1980
 Mr. Shahzada Alam Monnoo 1981
 Mr. Abdul Qayyam (Late) 1982
 Mr. Mohsin Raza Bukhari 1983
 Mr. Mushtaq Ahmad 1984
 Mr.Shahbaz Sharif 1985
 Mr. Mohammad Arshad Naeem 1986
 Mr. Mumtaz Hameed (Late) 1987
 Mir Salah ud Din (Late) 1988
 Mr. Tariq Hameed 1989
 Mr. Iftikhar Ali Malik 1990
 Mian Mohammad Ashraf 1991
 Mr. Salahuddin Ahmad Sahaf 1992
 Mr. Ishaq Dar 1993
 Mr. Bashir Ahmed Buksh 1994
 Mr. Tariq Sayeed Saigol 1995-96
 Sheikh Waheed Ud Din (Late) 1997
 Sheikh Saleem Ali (Late) 1998
 Mr. Pervez Hanif 1999
 Mr. Ilyas M. Chaudhry 2000
 Sheikh M. Asif 2001
 Dr. Khalid J. Chowdhry 2002
 Muhammad Yawar Irfan Khan 2003
 Mian Anjum Nasir 2004
 Mian Misbah ur Rehman 2005
 Mian Shafqat Ali 2006 
 Mr. Shahid Hassan Sheikh 2007
 Mohammad Ali Mian 2008
 Mian Muzaffar Ali 2009
 Mr. Mr.Zafar Iqbal Chaudhry 2010
 Mr. Shahzad Ali Malik 2011
 Mr. Irfan Qaiser Sheikh (Late) 2012
 Mr. Farooq Iftikhar 2013
 Engr. Sohail Lashari 2014
 Mr. Ijaz Ahmad Mumtaz 2015
 Sheikh Muhammad Arshad (Late) 2016 
 Mr. Abdul Basit 2017
 Mr. Malik Tahir Javed 2018
 Mr. Almas Hyder 2019
 Mr. Irfan Iqbal Sheikh 2020
 Mian Tariq Misbah 2021
 Mian Nauman Kabir 2022
 Mr.Kashif Anwar 2023

See also 
Economy of Pakistan
Lahore

References

LCCI felicitates new PCB chief - Business Recorder
Better Pak-India ties to strengthen their economies - Aaj TV
 Lahore chamber for boosting trade ties - The Tribune, India

Chambers of commerce in Pakistan
Economy of Lahore